Rear Admiral Niall Stuart Roderick Kilgour,  (born 4 March 1950) is a former Royal Navy officer who served as Commander Operations and Rear Admiral, Submarines.

Naval career
Educated at Hazelwood School and later Pangbourne College, Kilgour joined the Royal Navy in 1968 and had a distinguished career as a submariner.  On leaving submarines, he went on to be Commanding Officer of the frigates  and  – the latter of which came with the post of Captain of the 6th Frigate Squadron. In 1998 he was appointed as Commander Amphibious Task Group, and became Commander Operations. He served as part of the British military intervention in the Sierra Leone Civil War in 2000, for which he was awarded a Queen's Commendation for Valuable Service. 

Promoted to rear-admiral in September 2001, Kilgour returned to CINCFLEET at the Northwood Headquarters in northwest London, for the third time as Commander Operations, Flag Officer Submarines (subsequently Rear Admiral Submarines (RASM) in February 2002, the 'tribal chief' of Royal Navy submarines) and as the NATO Submarine Commander responsible for all submarine activity in the Eastern Atlantic and northern waters. Kilgour retired in June 2004.

Retirement
In retirement Kilgour became Chief Executive of The Hurlingham Club, He is President of the Submariners' Association, and Chairman of Trustees, Royal Navy Club.

References

1950 births
People educated at Hazelwood School
People educated at Pangbourne College
Companions of the Order of the Bath
Living people
Recipients of the Commendation for Valuable Service
Royal Navy rear admirals